Kevin Livingston (born May 24, 1973 in St. Louis, Missouri) is an American former professional cyclist.

Career 
Livingston rode six Tours de France, the Giro d'Italia and many of the European Classics, during a career with Motorola, Cofidis, US Postal Service and Team Telekom. He was one of Lance Armstrong's domestiques in the Tour de France and other races. His best result in the Tour de France was 17th overall, in 1998. He retired in 2002 and lives in Austin, Texas.

Doping 
Livingston's name was on the list of doping tests published by the French Senate on July 24, 2013 that were collected during the 1998 Tour de France and found positive for EPO when re-tested in 2004.

Athletic performances 
Livingston had 4% body fat, was able to reach a maximum heart rate of 195 bpm, and had an anaerobic threshold power of 558 Watts or 8.09 watt/kg.

Post-racing career 
Following retirement from racing, Livingston became a spokesperson and supporter of the National Diabetes Tour de Cure. He also acts as a consultant to Medalist Sports, where he has served as Competition Director for the Amgen Tour of California and the Tour of Missouri. He set up the PedalHard Training Center, with locations in Austin Texas and St. Louis Missouri, and Fort Worth, TX which provides training and testing facilities.

Major results

1992
 1st  Overall Tour of the Gila
1994
 1st  Amateur Road race, National Road Championships
 1st Stage 5 Tour of Austria
1996
 1st Stage 3 Tour of Galicia
 8th Giro del Veneto
1997
 Tour de l'Ain
1st Stages 4 & 5a 
 2nd Overall Tour de l'Avenir
1998
 10th Overall À travers Lausanne
1999
 6th Overall Critérium du Dauphiné Libéré
 8th Breitling Grand Prix (with Lance Armstrong)
2000
 9th Overall Vuelta a Burgos
2002
 7th Breitling Grand Prix (with Bobby Julich)

Grand Tour general classification results timeline

References

External links 
 
 
 
 

1973 births
Living people
American male cyclists
Sportspeople from St. Louis
Cyclists from Missouri